Sree Raam is an Indian actor who appears in Tamil language films. He made a breakthrough appearing as a child actor, winning a National Film Award for his performance in Pandiraj's Pasanga (2009). He has since appeared in the leading and supporting roles in films, and won acclaim for his portrayal in Goli Soda (2014).

He has worked in various films like Kattradhu Thamizh in 2007, Pasanga as Jeeva Nithyanandham in 2009, Theeradha Vilaiyattu Pillai as Young Kartik in 2010, Venghai as Young Selvam in 2011, Markandeyan in 2011, Vandhaan Vendraan as Young Ramana in 2011, Goli Soda as Saettu in 2014, Vajram as Madurai in 2015, Kamara Kattu as Ravi in 2015, Papanasam as Cheramadurai in 2015, Paisa in 2016 and Sagaa.

Career
Sree Raam made a breakthrough appearing as a child actor, winning the National Film Award for Best Child Artist for his performance in Pandiraj's Pasanga (2009). He then appeared in several films in smaller roles, portraying the younger version of the lead actor.

In 2014, he played one of the lead roles in Vijay Milton's Goli Soda and the success of the film, led him to be featured in films of a similar genre including Vajram (2015) and Kamara Kattu (2015). His performance in Goli Soda also saw him recommended and subsequently signed up for a role in Papanasam (2015) starring Kamal Haasan.

Filmography

References

External links

Living people
Male actors in Tamil cinema
21st-century Indian male actors
Indian male child actors
Indian male film actors
Year of birth missing (living people)
Place of birth missing (living people)
Best Child Artist National Film Award winners